Have Rocket, Will Travel is a 1959 American science-fiction comedy film released by Columbia Pictures and starring the Three Stooges, consisting of Moe Howard, Larry Fine and new addition Joe DeRita ("Curly Joe"). The film was produced to capitalize on the Three Stooges' late-1950s resurgence in popularity. The supporting cast features Anna-Lisa and Robert Colbert.

Plot
The Stooges are janitors working at a space center who are accidentally blasted to Venus. They encounter a talking unicorn, a giant fire-breathing tarantula and an alien computer that has destroyed all life on the planet and creates three evil robot duplicates of the Stooges. When the boys return home triumphant, a party is held in their honor that becomes a melee complicated by the arrival of the evil robots. An epilogue shows the Three Stooges riding on a rocket while singing and ends with Moe being hit with cream pies by Larry and Joe.

Cast
 Moe Howard - Moe/robot duplicate
 Larry Fine - Larry/robot duplicate
 Joe DeRita - Curly Joe/robot duplicate
 Anna-Lisa - Dr. Ingrid Naarveg
 Robert Colbert - Dr. Ted Benson
 Jerome Cowan - Mr. Morse
 Don Lamond - Venusian robot/reporter/narrator
 Robert Stevenson - Voice of the Thingtz
 Dal McKennon - Voice of Uni the Unicorn

Production
Have Rocket, Will Travel was Joe DeRita's inaugural screen appearance with the Stooges. He had replaced Joe Besser when Columbia ceased production of the Stooges' shorts series. The title is a play on the title of the popular television show of the time, Have Gun, Will Travel. Filming was completed over 13 days between May 18 and June 1, 1959.

Although billed as such, the film was not the first starring feature for the Three Stooges. Their first feature film was Rockin' in the Rockies (1945), which is also the only feature film with Moe, Larry and Curly. The Three Stooges had also starred in the 1951 filmGold Raiders with George O'Brien during the Shemp Howard era, and had supporting roles in several 1930s films when they were affiliated with Ted Healy, including Dancing Lady with Joan Crawford, Clark Gable, Robert Benchley and Fred Astaire.

The space-travel theme of Have Rocket, Will Travel was prevalent in the late 1950s. The Stooges had already filmed three shorts for Columbia based on this theme (Space Ship Sappy, Outer Space Jitters and Flying Saucer Daffy). They would appear in another space-themed comedy feature in 1962, The Three Stooges in Orbit.

In the original cut, the Stooges were the only people shown after the rocket-launch scene early in the film, but the studio insisted on a party scene in order to introduce other characters.

Reception

Box office
Have Rocket, Will Travel was released on August 1, 1959 to mixed critical reviews but was a success at the box office. During its first five days of a multiple-theater engagement in Los Angeles, where it was double-billed with The Legend of Tom Dooley, the film grossed $127,000 ($ today). The film ultimately grossed over $2.5 million ($ today) for Columbia Pictures against a $380,000 budget ($ today).

Critical response
Moe Howard expressed his dislike for the film in 1973, stating: "Didn't care much for Have Rocket, Will Travel. It was contrived a lot. The pies were dragged in at the tail end and not only that, the unicorn business and all that...ugh."

Soundtrack

The soundtrack was released as a two-sided 45-rpm single in August 1959 by Colpix Records to coincide with the film's release. The Three Stooges sing the film's theme song backed by vocal group the Tinglers. The title song was written by George Duning and Stanley Styne and arranged by Dennis Farnon.

The record sold well but did not chart highly because Columbia Pictures did not afford it much publicity.

See also
 List of American films of 1959

References

External links
 
 
 
 
 Have Rocket, Will Travel at threestooges.net

The Three Stooges films
1959 films
1950s science fiction comedy films
American science fiction comedy films
Films directed by David Lowell Rich
American black-and-white films
Films shot in Los Angeles
Columbia Pictures films
Films about unicorns
Films about extraterrestrial life
1959 comedy films
1950s English-language films
1950s American films